3D computer graphics, sometimes called CGI, 3D-CGI or three-dimensional computer graphics are graphics that use a three-dimensional representation of geometric data (often Cartesian) that is stored in the computer for the purposes of performing calculations and rendering digital images, usually 2D images but sometimes 3D images. The resulting images may be stored for viewing later (possibly as an animation) or displayed in real time.

3D computer graphics, contrary to what the name suggests, are most often displayed on two-dimensional displays. Unlike 3D film and similar techniques, the result is two-dimensional, without visual depth. More often, 3D graphics are being displayed on 3D displays, like in virtual reality systems.

3D graphics stand in contrast to 2D computer graphics which typically use completely different methods and formats for creation and rendering.

3D computer graphics rely on many of the same algorithms as 2D computer vector graphics in the wire-frame model and 2D computer raster graphics in the final rendered display. In computer graphics software, 2D applications may use 3D techniques to achieve effects such as lighting, and similarly, 3D may use some 2D rendering techniques.

The objects in 3D computer graphics are often referred to as 3D models. Unlike the rendered image, a model's data is contained within a graphical data file. A 3D model is a mathematical representation of any three-dimensional object; a model is not technically a graphic until it is displayed. A model can be displayed visually as a two-dimensional image through a process called 3D rendering, or it can be used in non-graphical computer simulations and calculations. With 3D printing, models are rendered into an actual 3D physical representation of themselves, with some limitations as to how accurately the physical model can match the virtual model.

History 

William Fetter was credited with coining the term computer graphics in 1961 to describe his work at Boeing. One of the first displays of computer animation was Futureworld (1976), which included an animation of a human face and a hand that had originally appeared in the 1971 experimental short A Computer Animated Hand, created by University of Utah students Edwin Catmull and Fred Parke.

3D computer graphics software began appearing for home computers in the late 1970s. The earliest known example is 3D Art Graphics, a set of 3D computer graphics effects, written by Kazumasa Mitazawa and released in June 1978 for the Apple II.

Overview
3D computer graphics production workflow falls into three basic phases: 
 3D modeling – the process of forming a computer model of an object's shape
 Layout and CGI animation – the placement and movement of objects (models, lights etc.) within a scene
 3D rendering – the computer calculations that, based on light placement, surface types, and other qualities, generate (rasterize the scene into) an image

Modeling

The model describes the process of forming the shape of an object. The two most common sources of 3D models are those that an artist or engineer originates on the computer with some kind of 3D modeling tool, and models scanned into a computer from real-world objects (Polygonal Modeling, Patch Modeling and NURBS Modeling are some popular tools used in 3d modeling). Models can also be produced procedurally or via physical simulation. Basically, a 3D model is formed from points called vertices that define the shape and form polygons. A polygon is an area formed from at least three vertices (a triangle). A polygon of n points is an n-gon. The overall integrity of the model and its suitability to use in animation depend on the structure of the polygons.

Layout and animation

Before rendering into an image, objects must be laid out in a scene. This defines spatial relationships between objects, including location and size. Animation refers to the temporal description of an object (i.e., how it moves and deforms over time. Popular methods include keyframing, inverse kinematics, and motion capture). These techniques are often used in combination. As with animation, physical simulation also specifies motion.

Materials and textures 
Materials and textures are properties that the render engine uses to render the model. One can give the model materials to tell the render engine how to treat light when it hits the surface. Textures are used to give the material color using a color or albedo map, or give the surface features using a bump map or normal map. It can be also used to deform the model itself using a displacement map.

Rendering

Rendering converts a model into an image either by simulating light transport to get photo-realistic images, or by applying an art style as in non-photorealistic rendering. The two basic operations in realistic rendering are transport (how much light gets from one place to another) and scattering (how surfaces interact with light). This step is usually performed using 3D computer graphics software or a 3D graphics API. Altering the scene into a suitable form for rendering also involves 3D projection, which displays a three-dimensional image in two dimensions. Although 3D modeling and CAD software may perform 3D rendering as well (e.g., Autodesk 3ds Max or Blender), exclusive 3D rendering software also exists (e.g., OTOY's Octane Rendering Engine, Maxon's Redshift)

Software 
3D computer graphics software produces computer-generated imagery (CGI) through 3D modeling and 3D rendering or produces 3D models for analytic, scientific and industrial purposes.

File formats 

There are many varieties of files supporting 3D graphics, for example, Wavefront .obj files and .x DirectX files. Each file type generally tends to have its own unique data structure.

Each file format can be accessed through their respective applications, such as DirectX files, and Quake. Alternatively, files can be accessed through third-party standalone programs, or via manual decompilation.

Modeling 

3D modeling software is a class of 3D computer graphics software used to produce 3D models. Individual programs of this class are called modeling applications or modelers.

3D modeling starts by describing 3 display models : Drawing Points, Drawing Lines and Drawing triangles and other Polygonal patches. 

3D modelers allow users to create and alter models via their 3D mesh. Users can add, subtract, stretch and otherwise change the mesh to their desire. Models can be viewed from a variety of angles, usually simultaneously. Models can be rotated and the view can be zoomed in and out.

3D modelers can export their models to files, which can then be imported into other applications as long as the metadata are compatible. Many modelers allow importers and exporters to be plugged-in, so they can read and write data in the native formats of other applications.

Most 3D modelers contain a number of related features, such as ray tracers and other rendering alternatives and texture mapping facilities. Some also contain features that support or allow animation of models. Some may be able to generate full-motion video of a series of rendered scenes (i.e. animation).

Computer-aided design (CAD) 

Computer aided design software may employ the same fundamental 3D modeling techniques that 3D modeling software use but their goal differs. They are used in computer-aided engineering, computer-aided manufacturing, Finite element analysis, product lifecycle management, 3D printing and computer-aided architectural design.

Complementary tools 
After producing video, studios then edit or composite the video using programs such as Adobe Premiere Pro or Final Cut Pro at the mid-level, or Autodesk Combustion, Digital Fusion, Shake at the high-end. Match moving software is commonly used to match live video with computer-generated video, keeping the two in sync as the camera moves.

Use of real-time computer graphics engines to create a cinematic production is called machinima.

Differences with other types of computer graphics

Distinction from photorealistic 2D graphics

Not all computer graphics that appear 3D are based on a wireframe model. 2D computer graphics with 3D photorealistic effects are often achieved without wireframe modeling and are sometimes indistinguishable in the final form. Some graphic art software includes filters that can be applied to 2D vector graphics or 2D raster graphics on transparent layers. Visual artists may also copy or visualize 3D effects and manually render photorealistic effects without the use of filters.

Pseudo 3D and true 3D

Some video games use restricted projections of three-dimensional environments, such as isometric graphics or virtual cameras with fixed angles, either as a way to improve performance of the game engine or for stylistic and gameplay concerns. Such games are said to use pseudo 3D graphics. By contrast, games using 3D computer graphics without such restrictions are said to use true 3D.

See also

References

External links 

 A Critical History of Computer Graphics and Animation (Wayback Machine copy)
 How Stuff Works - 3D Graphics
 History of Computer Graphics series of articles (Wayback Machine copy)
 How 3D Works - Explains 3D modeling for an illuminated manuscript

 
Computer graphics
3D graphics software
Computer graphics
Visual effects